Giancarlo Livraghi  (25 November 1927 – 22 February 2014) was an Italian author and advertising executive.

Born in Milan and graduated in philosophy at the University of Milan, while studying he had started working as a reporter, an editor and a bibliographer. His first full-time job began in 1952, when he joined as a copywriter in the CPV agency (Italian headquarters of Colman, Prentis and Varley) becoming a short time later the creative director of the agency. He worked for many major Italian and international companies of the advertising industry, also holding institutional positions.

As a scholar, starting from the 1990s Livraghi studied and analyzed in several publications the values of human communication via internet.  He was co-founder, with Andrea Mazzucchi, and first president of ALCEI, initially conceived as the Italian branch of EFF.

References 

1927 births
2014 deaths
Writers from Milan
University of Milan alumni
Italian essayists
Italian male non-fiction writers
Italian advertising executives
Male essayists